Route 103 is a numbered state highway running  in Rhode Island, United States. It runs from Interstate 195 (I-195) in East Providence to the Massachusetts state line in the town of Warren, where the road continues as Massachusetts Route 103. Route 103 is a major commercial corridor in East Providence.

Route description
Route 103 begins at the eastbound Exit 1D off-ramp of I-195 in East Providence, running along Warren Avenue until the intersection with Route 114. Route 103 turns south with Route 114 along Pawtucket Avenue, with Route 114 soon separating. Route 103 continues south then veers to the southeast along Willett Avenue as it heads towards the town of Barrington. In Barrington, it continues east as County Road, then meets with and overlaps Route 114 for a second time as the routes cross the Barrington and Palmer rivers into the town of Warren. Route 103 separates from Route 114 along Child Street as it continues east towards the Massachusetts state line, where the road continues as Massachusetts Route 103.

History
Route 103 was an original route assigned in 1923. It used to be much longer, extending  through Providence and along present-day Route 14 to Connecticut, where it used to continue as Route 103. In 1932, Connecticut renumbered its 1920s Route 103 to Route 14. Rhode Island renumbered the portion of Route 103 west of Providence to match the new Connecticut route number.

At one time, the main road east from Providence (at first NE 3, now U.S. Route 6 or US 6) used Route 103 rather than the current US 6 alignment. Maps disagree on when the change to the current alignment took place. However, rather than using Warren Avenue to the Washington Bridge, the main road continued north on Pawtucket Avenue to Waterman Avenue, and used Waterman Avenue over the old Red Bridge to Providence. When the main road was moved to current US 6, it at first continued to use Waterman Avenue via MA 114A and County Street to the state line.

The current alignment of Route 103 along Warren Avenue in East Providence was also US 6 before I-195 was built. Some signs still mark it as US 6, including some signs placed since 2000.

Major intersections

Route 103A 

Route 103A is a  loop route of Route 103 in the Riverside section of East Providence. It leaves Route 103, continuing straight along Bullocks Point Avenue where Route 103 veers southeast on Willett Avenue. At the south end of Bullocks Point Avenue in Crescent Park, Route 103A turns east onto Crescent View Avenue, which later ends back at Willett Avenue/Route 103. Route 103A was coordinated as a numbered State Highway in 2001.

References

External links

2019 Highway Map, Rhode Island

103
Transportation in Bristol County, Rhode Island